Gorsedh Kernow (Cornish Gorsedd) is a non-political Cornish organisation, based in Cornwall, United Kingdom, which exists to maintain the national Celtic spirit of Cornwall. It is based on the Welsh-based Gorsedd, which was founded by Iolo Morganwg in 1792.

History

The Gorsedh Kernow (Gorsedd of Cornwall) was set up in 1928 at Boscawen-Un by Henry Jenner, one of the early proponents of Cornish language revival, who took the bardic name "Gwas Myghal", meaning "servant of Michael". He and twelve others (including Kitty Lee Jenner) were initiated by the Archdruid of Wales. It has been held every year since, except during World War II. 1,000 people have been Cornish bards, including Dame Alida Brittain, Ken George, R. Morton Nance, and Peter Berresford Ellis.

After 1939 the Council of the Gorsedd of Cornwall approved additional regalia, and asked Francis Cargeeg to design and execute new regalia for the Grand Bard, the Deputy Grand Bard and the Secretary, and two headpieces for the Marshal's staves. Over time, and up to 1970, additional pieces were added, including plastrons for past Grand Bards, also produced by Francis Cargeeg. More metalwork was carried out for the Gorsedh by John Turner and by Cyril Orchard.

The Gorsedh Kernow has now opened up to all forms of revived Cornish language, and states its aim as "to maintain the national Celtic spirit of Cornwall". The Gorsedh also encourages the study of the arts and history. It has been held annually since and has become an important institution in Cornwall's cultural and civic life. Its competitions attract many applicants and the "open Gorsedh" is attended by many Cornish people. There is also extensive coverage on local media.

An important part of the open Gorsedh is the awarding of bardships to individuals for meritorious work for Cornish culture. Thus the Gorsedh acts in many ways as a form of "honours system". Bardships are awarded for study in the language, services to Cornish music, encouraging the arts (especially amongst children) amongst other things. Initiate Bards are given Bardic names by the Grand Bard who welcomes them into the College of Bards. These names are in Cornish and will often refer somehow to the reason for their bardship: other Bardic names refer to the Bard's personal or family name, or describe the Bards themselves,

The three major Gorsedhs in Britain are recorded in an ancient Welsh triad as being held at Moel Merw and Bryn Gwyddon in Wales and Boscawen-Un in Cornwall (ref: Craig Weatherhill). After domination of the Brythonic Celts by the Saxons the Bardic tradition fell into disuse and despite attempts at revival over the centuries lost all its prestige.

The Gorsedh for 2008 was held in September 2008 in Looe which coincided with the Dehwelans Kernow festival. The 2009 Gorsedh began on 18 April at Saltash.

The first bards of Gorsedh Kernow at Boscawen-Un
 Michael Ambrose Cardew (Myghal An Pry)
 Charles G. Henderson (Map Hendra)
 William Benjamin Tregoning Hooper (Bras y Golon)
 James Dryden Hosken (Caner Helles)
 Kenneth Hamilton Jenkin (Lef Stenoryon)
 Arthur Quiller-Couch (Marghak Cough)
 Edgar Algernon Rees (Carer Losow)
 George Sloggett (Gwas Petrock)
 Thomas Taylor (Gwas Ust)
 Herbert Thomas (Barth Colonnek)
 James Thomas (Tas Cambron)
 John Coulson Tregarthen (Mylgarer)

Morton Nance became the second Grand Bard in 1934. He said, "One generation has set Cornish on its feet. It is now for another to make it walk." Although the early Gorsedh used the Unified form, in June 2009, members voted overwhelmingly to adopt the new Standard Written Form as their standard.

Lists of Cornish bards and venues

1899 – 1928
1899, Wales
 John Hobson Matthews (Mab Cernyw)
 Reginald Reynolds (Gwas Piran)
 Hettie Tangye Reynolds (Merch Eia)

1903, Brittany
 Henry Jenner (Gwas Myghal)

1904, Wales
 Kitty Lee Jenner (Morvoren)
 L. C. R. Duncombe Jewell (Bardd Glas)

1928, Wales
 Albert Marwood Bluett (Gwryghonen Vew)
 James Sims Carah (Gwas Crowan)
 Gilbert Hunter Doble (Gwas Gwendron)
 Robert Morton Nance (Mordon)
 Annie Pool (Myrgh Piala)
 Trelawney Roberts (Gonader A Bell)
 Joseph Hambley Rowe (Tolzethan)
 William Charles Daniel Watson (Tirvab)

Venues in Cornwall since 1928

Jori Ansell, Caradok. Barded in 1978 at Merry Maidens, St Buryan by examination in the Cornish language. Joined GK Council as elected member in 1985. Deputy Grand Bard 1988-1991. Grand Bard 1991-1994.   Chair GK Constitutional sub-committee.

List of Grand Bards of the Gorsedh Kernow since 1928

List of Deputy Grand Bards of the Gorsedh Kernow since 1928

See also

 List of topics related to Cornwall

References

External links
 
 
 
 
 

Celtic Revival
Cornish culture
Cornish language
Cornish nationalism
Gorseddau
Organizations established in 1928
Poetry organizations